Severe flooding in Myanmar began in July 2015 and continued into September, affecting 12 of the country's 14 states, resulting in about 103 deaths and affecting up to 1,000,000 people. Most of the casualties were reported from the Irrawaddy Delta. Torrential rains that began on 16 July destroyed farmland, roads, rail tracks, bridges and houses, leading the government to declare a state of emergency on 30 July in the four worst-hit regions in the west—Magway Division, Sagaing Division, Chin State and Rakhine State.

Myanmar's Ministry of Agriculture reported that more than 1.29 million acres of farm land have been inundated and 687,200 acres damaged. Moreover, 15,239 houses were destroyed, according to OCHA figures.

Background

Beginning on 16 July 2015, unusually heavy monsoon rain fell on Myanmar, causing rivers and creeks to overflow with rainwater and flooding low-lying areas around waterways. By August, the flooding was the worst to affect the country for decades. In addition to the higher-than-average rainfall, mismanagement of irrigation projects and deforestation caused by logging have been cited by U Win Myo Thu, head of environmental organization EcoDev, as contributing to the flooding. Cyclone Komen, which struck in late July, also made the situation worse.

Affected areas

Sagaing Division
Kalay Township was severely affected by flooding; news reports showed the welcome signboard of the town completely submerged underwater. Kantbalu was also severely affected.

Magway Division
Overspills of Mone and Man creek affected 300 villages as well as town area in Pwintbyu, Sidoktaya and Ngape. Sinbyugyun, a city in Magway Division, was not affected by the flood.

Relief efforts
The government has been accused of responding slowly to the crisis. However, unlike in 2008 during Cyclone Nargis when it refused outside help, this time around the government has sought international aid. The United Nations pledged $9m (£6m) in assistance. The UN's World Food Programme has delivered aid to 82,000 people in the worst hit parts of western Myanmar.

See also

 2022 Pyin Oo Lwin flood
List of floods
2015 North Indian Ocean cyclone season
Harda twin train derailment
2013 Somalia cyclone
2012 Nigeria floods
Cyclone Komen

References

External links
Myanmar Flood Information

2015 in Myanmar
Floods in Myanmar
2015 floods in Asia
Sagaing Region
Magway Region
History of Rakhine
Chin State
2015 disasters in Myanmar